J. B. Courtney Woolen Mills are textile manufacturing mills in Appleton, Wisconsin, United States. The company was originally owned by the Kelley family and was purchased by the Courtney family in 1904. Afterwards, the company changed its name from Kelley Knitting Company to J. B. Courtney Woolen Mills. The mills added to the National Register of Historic Places in 1993 for their industrial and architectural significance.

References

Buildings and structures in Appleton, Wisconsin
Industrial buildings completed in 1880
Industrial buildings and structures on the National Register of Historic Places in Wisconsin
Textile mills in the United States
Woollen mills
National Register of Historic Places in Outagamie County, Wisconsin
1880 establishments in Wisconsin